Connemara National Park is one of six national parks in Ireland, managed by the National Parks and Wildlife Service. It is located in the northwest of Connemara in County Galway, on the west coast.

History
Connemara National Park was founded and opened to the public in 1980. It features 2,000 hectares of mountains, bogs, heaths, grasslands and forests. The entrance is situated on the Clifden side of Letterfrack. There are many remnants of human habitation within the park. There is a 19th-century graveyard as well as 4,000-year-old megalithic court tombs. Much of the land was once part of the Kylemore Abbey estate.

Environment

Flora
Western blanket bog and heathland are the most common vegetation of Connemara National Park. The boglands are situated in the wet low lying environments whereas the blanket bog exists within the drier mountain atmosphere. Purple moorgrass is the most bountiful plant, creating colorful landscapes throughout the countryside. Carnivorous plants play an important role in the park's ecosystem, the most common being sundew and butterworts trap. Bogs hold very little nutrients so many plants obtain their energy from the digestion of insects. Other common plants include lousewort, bog cotton, milkwort, bog asphodel, orchids and bog myrtle, with a variety of lichens and mosses.

Fauna
Connemara National Park is noted for its diversity of bird life. Common song birds include meadow pipits, skylarks, European stonechats, common chaffinches, European robins and Eurasian wrens. Native birds of prey include the common kestrel and Eurasian sparrowhawk with the merlin and peregrine falcon being seen less frequently. Woodcock, common snipe, common starling, song thrush, mistle thrush, redwing fieldfare and mountain goat migrate to Connemara during the winter.

Mammals are often difficult to find, but are present nonetheless. Fieldmice are common in the woodlands, whereas rabbits, foxes, stoats, shrews, and bats at night, are often sighted in the boglands. Red deer once roamed Connemara but were extirpated from the area approximately 150 years ago. An attempt was made to reintroduce red deer to Connemara and a herd was established within the park. Nowadays, the largest mammal in the park is the Connemara pony.

See also
 Connemara
 Kylemore Abbey
 Twelve Bens
 Clifden
 Letterfrack

References

External links
 National Parks Website
 Connemara National Park Website

National parks of the Republic of Ireland
Geography of County Galway
Protected areas established in 1980
1980 establishments in Ireland
Parks in County Galway